Franko Uzelac (born 5 November 1994) is a Croatian footballer who plays as a centre back for TSV Alemannia Aachen.

Career
In July 2017 Uzelac moved to Regionalliga Nord side SV Babelsberg from 3. Liga club Würzburger Kickers.

References

External links
 
 

Living people
1994 births
People from Ahlen
Sportspeople from Münster (region)
Footballers from North Rhine-Westphalia
German people of Croatian descent
Association football central defenders
German footballers
Croatian footballers
Croatia youth international footballers
VfB Oldenburg players
Würzburger Kickers players
SV Babelsberg 03 players
SC Fortuna Köln players
Alemannia Aachen players
Regionalliga players
2. Bundesliga players
3. Liga players
Croatian expatriate footballers
Croatian expatriate sportspeople in Germany